Kapluk is a village in Baringo County, Kenya, in the base of Kerio Valley. The population is about 2000 people. The major ethnic group is the Tugen, the residents settled in the area around 1700 AD.

The major economic activity is farming, crops like cotton, maize, and animal keeping especially, goats and cows. It is the hub of Kabutie location of Barwesa division. There is a secondary school, four primary schools, a health center, 5 churches, and a cattle dip.

Kapluk is part of bsrwessa ward of Baringo North Constituency in Baringo County 

The current elections are over and Zaphania Chepkonga was declared the councillor after trouncing Bowen Charles by 300 votes. The much closely contested saw the former councillor beaten after three other contestants united to bring his leadership to a dramatic end, among those who stepped down for Zephania Chepkonga included Benjamin Ayabei, John Ruto, Kigen Chris.

The crowning of the new councillor was marked with song and dance on 27 Dec 2007 at Muchukwo Centre where the current councillor promised to unite the people of Kabutiei.

The councillor has been in the limelight because he comes from the area where the popular Lake Kamnarok is located, he also promised to promote the place as a fast tourist area.

References 

Populated places in Baringo County